Stefano Rusconi (born October 2, 1968) is a retired Italian professional basketball player.

Professional career
Rusconi was drafted by the Cleveland Cavaliers, in the 2nd round (52nd overall pick), of the 1990 NBA Draft. They traded his NBA draft rights to the Phoenix Suns, in 1991, for the draft rights to Miloš Babić. Rusconi appeared in seven games with the Suns, in the 1995–96 NBA season. 

He was a member of the FIBA European Selection team, in 1990. Rusconi was the Italian League MVP in 1995.

National team career
Rusconi was a member of the senior Italian national basketball team. With Italy, he won the silver medal at the 1991 EuroBasket.

External links
Italian League Profile 
Liga ACB Profile Retrieved 7 July 2015 
NBA stats @ basketballreference.com

1968 births
Living people
Centers (basketball)
Cleveland Cavaliers draft picks
Italian expatriate basketball people in Spain
Italian expatriate basketball people in the United States
Italian men's basketball players
Lega Basket Serie A players
Liga ACB players
National Basketball Association players from Italy
Olimpia Milano players
Pallacanestro Reggiana players
Pallacanestro Treviso players
Pallacanestro Varese players
Phoenix Suns players
Saski Baskonia players